Kötz is a municipality in the district of Günzburg in Bavaria in Germany.

Famous people 
 Dennis Chessa, footballer for Bayern Munich II

References 

Populated places in Günzburg (district)